The Montgomery Area School District is a small, rural, public school district in Lycoming County. The school is centered on the borough of Montgomery and also serves: Clinton Township, Brady Township, and Washington Township. According to 2000 federal census data, it serves a resident population of 7,749. By 2010, the district's population declined to 7,429 people. In 2009, the district residents’ per capita income was $14,133, while the median family income was $42,027. In the Commonwealth, the median family income was $49,501 and the United States median family income was $49,445, in 2010. The educational attainment levels for the population (25 years old and over) were 81.9% high school graduates and 10.9% college graduates.

According to the Pennsylvania Budget and Policy Center, 58.3% of the district's pupils lived at 185% or below the Federal Poverty Level  as shown by their eligibility for the federal free or reduced price school meal programs in 2012. In Lycoming County, the median household income was $45,430. By 2013, the median household income in the United States rose to $52,100. In 2014, the median household income in the USA was $53,700.

Montgomery Area School District operates 3 public schools: Montgomery Area High School, Montgomery Middle School and Montgomery Elementary School. The BLaST Intermediate Unit IU17 provides the district with a wide variety of services like specialized education for disabled students and hearing, speech and visual disability services and professional development for staff and faculty. The district does not participate in a career and technical school in the region. Elimsport Elementary School was closed at the end of the 2011 school year due to low enrollment and district budget constraints.

Extracurriculars
The Montgomery Area School District offers a wide variety of clubs, activities and an extensive sports program.  Several sports are offered in cooperation with the Muncy School District.

Sports
The district funds:

Boys
Baseball - A
Basketball- A
Football - A
Golf - AA
Soccer - A
Tennis - AA
Track and field - AA
 Wrestling  - AA

Girls
Basketball - A
Golf - AA
Soccer - A
Softball - A
Tennis - AA
Track and field - AA

Junior high school sports

Boys
Basketball
Football
Wrestling 

Girls
Basketball

According to PIAA directory July 2015

References

External links
 

School districts in Lycoming County, Pennsylvania
Susquehanna Valley